Key is the second full-length from Omaha, NE's Son, Ambulance.

It is the 71st release from Saddle Creek Records.

Track listing
"Entropy" – 0:40
"Paper Snowflakes" – 4:15
"Billy Budd" – 3:49
"Chlorophyll" – 4:54
"Sex in C Minor" – 7:02
 "C Minor Interlude" – 1:27
"House Guest" – 4:34
"Taxi-Cab Driver" – 3:16 
"Case of You/Wrinkle, Wrinkle" – 8:48
"Glitter Angel" – 4:33
"If I Should Fall Asleep" – 5:39
"Pleasure, Now" – 5:19
"[untitled track]" – 0:22

Personnel
Musicians
Corey Broman – Drums
Daniel Knapp – Piano, Keyboards
Joe Knapp – Vocals, Guitar
Erica Peterson – Bass, Vocals
Dylan Strimple – Lead Guitar
Becky Allen – Vocals
Austin Britton – Sax
Carrie Butler – Violin
Kate Falkowski – Monologue
Landon Hedges – Guitar
Tim Kasher – Accordion
Neal Knapp – Phone Message
Jenna Morrison – Lyrics and Vocals
Conor Oberst – Lyrics
Heather Schulte – Vocals

Production
AJ Mogis – Recording, Mixing, Engineering
Mike Mogis – Preliminary Tracking
Doug Van Sloun – Mastering
Son, Ambulance – Production

Artwork
Jenna Morrison
Daniel Knapp
Matt Koster
Jeff Koster
Casey Scott
Jadon Ulrich

References

2004 albums
Son, Ambulance albums
Saddle Creek Records albums